Vyazkovka is a rural locality (a selo) in Bityug-Matryonovskoye Rural Settlement, Ertilsky District, Voronezh Oblast, Russia. The population was 166 as of 2010. There are 3 streets.

Geography 
Vyazkovka is located 31 km northwest of Ertil (the district's administrative centre) by road. Gnilusha is the nearest rural locality.

References 

Rural localities in Ertilsky District